No Defense is a 1929 American romantic drama film directed by Lloyd Bacon and starring Monte Blue. It was a silent film with part talking and sound-effects using the Vitaphone system. It was distributed by Warner Brothers.

Cast
Monte Blue as Monte Collins
May McAvoy as Ruth Harper
Lee Moran as Snitz
Kathryn Carver as Lois Harper
William H. Tooker as Mr. Harper Sr.
William Desmond as John Harper
Bud Marshall as The Construction Worker

Preservation status
No Defense is now a lost film.

References

External links

1929 films
Warner Bros. films
Lost American films
Films directed by Lloyd Bacon
1929 romantic drama films
American romantic drama films
American black-and-white films
Films with screenplays by Robert Lord (screenwriter)
1920s American films